The Greece national badminton team represents Greece in international badminton team competitions. Badminton events regarding the national team are organized by the Hellenic Badminton Federation. The Greek team competed in the Sudirman Cup until 2003 where it failed to qualify. 

The Greek team also once competed in the Helvetia Cup, which was cancelled after 2007.

Participation in BWF competitions

Sudirman Cup

Participation in European Team Badminton Championships

Men's Team

Women's Team

Participation in Helvetia Cup 
The Helvetia Cup or European B Team Championships was a European mixed team championship in badminton. The first Helvetia Cup tournament took place in Zurich, Switzerland in 1962. The tournament took place every two years from 1971 until 2007, after which it was dissolved.

Participation in European Junior Team Badminton Championships
Mixed Team

Current squad 

Male players
Petros Tentas
Ilias Xanthou
Axilleas Tsartsidis
Christo Tsartsidis
Dimitrios Papadopoulos
Theodoros Papadopoulos
George Galvas
Panagiotis Skarlatos
Paschalis Melikidis
Vasileios Rafail Kiosses

Female players
Elisavet Koronidou
Grammatoula Sotiriou
Irini Tenta
Rafailia Mertzemeki
Eirini Goygleri
Theodora Lambrianidou
Eleni Moutevelidou

References

Badminton
National badminton teams
Badminton in Greece